Durham University Business School is the business school of Durham University and is located in Durham, England. Established in 1965, it holds triple accreditation (AACSB, AMBA and EQUIS). It is currently ranked between 7th and 67th in the world for its MBA and MSc programmes by the Financial Times, The Economist and the Expansión. The Global MBA is currently ranked 43rd in the world by the Financial Times.

The University's Department of Economics and Finance and the Foundation for Small and Medium Enterprise Development merged with the business school in 2002 to become the School of Economics, Finance and Business, more commonly known as Durham University Business School.

Accreditations
The university holds full UK degree-awarding powers which are audited by the UK's Quality Assurance Agency for Higher Education. Additional recognition for courses in the business school is provided by accreditation with several organisations at the national and international level, such as the Association to Advance Collegiate Schools of Business of the United States – AACSB, the European Quality Improvement System in Europe – EQUIS, and the Association of Masters of Business Administration of the United Kingdom – AMBA.

Rankings and reputation
In 2020, the Financial Times ranked the Online MBA 7th in the world and the Global MBA 63rd in the world. Also in 2020, the pre-experience Masters in Finance was ranked 49th in the world and the Master's in Management 63rd in the world.

The Economist ranked the MBA 37th overall (2nd in the UK) in 2021 in a global list of schools which excluded six of the nine UK schools ranked by the Financial Times. The ranking placed Durham University Business School ahead of Nottingham University Business School. The Economist ranked Durham University's Master's in Management 27th in the world in 2017.

The Durham Global MBA was also placed 11th in the world and 5th in the UK by the 2015 QS Distance Online MBA Rankings, while the Executive MBA was ranked 49th in the world by the 2013 Economist EMBA Ranking.

 Expansión– Mexico's leading business magazine – ranked the full-time MBA 63rd internationally in 2018 and the Executive MBA 48th in 2017. 
 The Wall Street Journal Accelerated MBA Rankings, which lists the Top 15 Schools, ranked Durham University Business School 14th in the world and 2nd in the UK in 2009. The rankings placed Durham University Business School ahead of Oxford Business School and Cambridge Business School.
 Ranked 15th in the world in Top Business Schools Internationally Known by EDUNIVERSAL's International Scientific Committee in 2008.

Courses
Durham University Business School provides courses at undergraduate and postgraduate levels. Undergraduate courses include Bachelor's degrees in the fields of economics, finance, business, marketing and accounting. Postgraduate degrees are offered in management, marketing, finance and economics, including MBA, MA, MSc, DBA and PhD.  Courses are offered in full-time, part-time and distance learning formats.

Research 

Durham University Business School has more than 200 research students. In the 2008 Research Assessment Exercise, 95 per cent of the Business and Management Studies research at Durham University was assessed as being at least of International Quality (2* and above) in terms of originality, significance and rigour. This positions the school 19th in a total of 90 schools within the business and management sector (based on the Grade Point Average score) in Great Britain.

The school's research centres and groups are diverse and extend across geographical and cultural boundaries.

Visiting academics – past and present – include:
  Guangjing Cao, chairman of the China Three Gorges Project Corporation (CTGPC) on the Yangtze River.
  Glenn Carroll Stanford University and Columbia University, specialist on Population Ecology
  Jack Cohen, specialist in complexity and chaos theory
  Kenneth Davies, senior economist and head of global relations, OECD.
  Werner De Bondt DePaul University, specialist in behavioural finance
  John Doukas Old Dominion University specialist in mergers & acquisitions, and asset price anomalies
  Robin Gilchrist, vice president, Alcatel-Lucent
  David Gravells, former chairman of the Association of MBAs of United Kingdom
  David Greatbatch, former academic of Oxford University and XEROX Research Laboratory, Cambridge
  Chris Greensted, associate director (quality services) of EQUIS
  Mike Hannan Stanford University, specialist on population ecology
  Sir Roger Jackling, KCB, CBE, former head of The Defence Academy of the United Kingdom
 Gregory Koutmos Fairfield University specialist in asset pricing and volatility
  Ehud Lehrer, Bar Ilan University, specialist on game theory;
  Grigor McClelland, former director of Manchester Business School
  Bill McKelvey, professor of strategic organizing and complexity theory at the UCLA Anderson School of Management
  Ray Rist, adviser, World Bank, Washington D.C.

Affiliates
The business school has extensive links with companies, organisations and academic institutions. In particular the business school is engaged in research with:
 The Institute of Chartered Accountants in England and Wales (ICAEW)
 The Association of Chartered Certified Accountants (ACCA)
 Chartered Institute of Management Accountants (CIMA)
 British Accounting and Finance Association (BAFA)

The school's academic network includes:
 Central University of Finance and Economics, Beijing, China
 Fudan University, Shanghai, China
 Sun Yat-Sen University, Guangzhou, China
 Euromed Marseille Ecole de Management, Marseille, France
 Aix-Marseille University, Marseille, France
 EBS University of Business and Law, Germany
 University of Mannheim, Germany
 WHU – Otto Beisheim School of Management, Germany
 University of Hong Kong, Hong Kong
 University of Pisa, Italy
 University of Trento, Italy
 University of Udine, Italy
 University of Tokyo, Japan
 BI Norwegian School of Management, Norway
 Financial University under the Government of the Russian Federation, Moscow, Russia
 Institute of Business Studies (IBS-Moscow), Russian Presidential Academy of National Economy and Public Administration, Russia
 Lund University, Sweden
 University of Stellenbosch, South Africa
 Korea University, Seoul, South Korea

Notable alumni
The school has around 25,000 alumni from over 150 countries worldwide.
The following individuals are alumni (listed by first name order and qualifications with year of graduation if known)
 Andrew Thorburn, MBA (Distinction), CEO of the National Australia Bank and former CEO of Bank of New Zealand
 Anwar Choudhury, MBA, British High Commissioner to Bangladesh
 Barry Rowland, MBA (1997), Chief Executive of the Falkland Islands
 James Averdieck, BA in economics (1988), founder and former managing director of Gü
 Rupert Hoogewerf, BA in Chinese with Japonese (1993), founder and Chairman of Hurun Report
 John Vane, 11th Baron Barnard, MSc (1987), British peer and landowner
 Kerryann Ifill, MBA, president of the Senate, Barbados
 Nigel Phillips, MBA (1997) Governor of the Falkland Islands
 Norman Lacy, MSc, Minister for Educational Services and Minister for the Arts, Government of Victoria, Australia
 Paul Madden, MBA (2002), British High Commissioner to Australia
 Will Greenwood, BA in Economics (1994), English rugby union player in the 1990s and 2000s

Honorary doctorates 
 Joseph Stiglitz DCL – recipient of the Nobel Memorial Prize in Economic Sciences (2001) and the John Bates Clark Medal (1979) – honorary doctor of Durham University Business School

Plagiarism incident 
In January 2002 Professor Tony Antoniou was appointed as the sixth dean of the business school. He was suspended in October 2007 after allegations of plagiarism. In March 2008 Antoniou was dismissed by the university for misconduct.

See also 

 List of Business Schools in Europe
 Triple Accreditation of Business Schools

References

External links
 Durham University Business School

Durham University
Business schools in England